Elections were held in the state of Western Australia between 27 April and 26 May 1897 to elect 44 members to the Western Australian Legislative Assembly. The Ministerialist group led by John Forrest won a third term in office as a result of the elections. The poll took place based on boundaries established in the Constitution Act Amendment Act 1896, which increased the number of members from 33 mainly by adding new seats in the Goldfields region, and had been called a year earlier than was necessary. In 18 of the 44 seats, only one candidate nominated and polls were not held.

As payment of members was not introduced until 1900, the Political Labour Party, formed in 1896, had found it difficult to attract candidates who could afford to enter Parliament, but three of its candidates ran for election, and Charles Oldham, a former president of the Trades and Labor Council, became the first Labour member of Parliament in Western Australia.

Results

|}

Notes:
 The Ministerialists' total of 29 seats includes 16 which were uncontested, representing 4,297 of the 23,318 enrolled voters. A further two seats, won by George Leake (Albany, Oppositionist) and Elias Solomon (South Fremantle, Independent) representing 1,907 enrolled voters were also uncontested.

See also
 Members of the Western Australian Legislative Assembly, 1894–1897
 Members of the Western Australian Legislative Assembly, 1897–1901

References

Elections in Western Australia
1897 elections in Australia
April 1897 events
May 1897 events
1890s in Western Australia